The near-close front unrounded vowel, or near-high front unrounded vowel, is a type of vowel sound, used in some spoken languages. The International Phonetic Association advises serifs on the symbol's ends. Some sans-serif fonts do meet this typographic specification. Prior to 1989, there was an alternate symbol for this sound: , the use of which is no longer sanctioned by the IPA. Despite that, some modern writings still use it.

Handbook of the International Phonetic Association defines  as a mid-centralized (lowered and centralized) close front unrounded vowel (transcribed  or ), and the current official IPA name of the vowel transcribed with the symbol  is a near-close near-front unrounded vowel. It occurs in some dialects of English (such as Californian, General American and modern Received Pronunciation) as well as some other languages (such as Icelandic), and it can be transcribed with the symbol  (a lowered ) in narrow transcription. Certain sources may even use  for the close-mid front unrounded vowel, but that is rare. For the close-mid (near-)front unrounded vowel that is not usually transcribed with the symbol  (or ), see close-mid front unrounded vowel.

There may be phonological reasons not to transcribe the fully front variant with the symbol , which may incorrectly imply a relation to the close .

Sometimes, especially in broad transcription, this vowel is transcribed with a simpler symbol , which technically represents the close front unrounded vowel.

Features 

 The prototypical  is somewhat further back (near-front) than the neighboring cardinal vowels.

Occurrence

Notes

References

External links
 
 

Near-close vowels
Front vowels
Unrounded vowels